Gustav Niessl von Mayendorf (26 April 1839 in Verona – 1 September 1919 in Hütteldorf, Vienna; often cited as G. von Niessl),  was an Austrian astronomer and mycologist.

Niessl, the son of an artillery officer, studied at the Polytechnic in Vienna in 1857 and became assistant to practical geometry.  In 1859 he took the chair of practical geometry at German Technical University in Brno, where he became a full professor in 1860 and later taught applied geometry, astronomy and higher geodesy.  He became the director in 1868/1869.  After this technical college, he was its rector in 1877/78 and 1888/89.  In 1907 he retired (and in the same year received an honorary doctorate). For several decades he was secretary of the Natural Science Society in Brno.

Niessl was first engaged in geodesy.  As an astronomer, he was employed with Niessl meteor orbits and also wrote the article in the Enzyklopädie der mathematischen Wissenschaften (Encyclopedia of Mathematical Sciences) (1907).  Niessl was also a significant mycologist and mushroom collector, whose collection is currently housed at the Botanical State Collection Munich.  He was regarded as an expert in the flora of Moravia and Silesia, and had close contact with the botanist Gottlob Ludwig Rabenhorst.

Two fungal species were named after him.  He was particularly concerned with microscopic sac fungi, slime molds, and rusts.

From 1904 until his death, he was a corresponding member of the Austrian Academy of Sciences.  He was also a member of the Austrian Commission for International Geodesy and the Austrian Patent Court.

References

1839 births
1919 deaths
Austrian mycologists
19th-century Austrian astronomers
20th-century Austrian astronomers